Teesdale Business Park is a major business park on the former site of Head Wrightsons' Teesdale works in Thornaby-on-Tees, North Yorkshire, England. The park was redeveloped by the Teesside Development Corporation.
The area is immediately north of Thornaby railway station.

The business park is bounded by the Tees Valley Rail-line and the River Tees. It is a short distance from Stockton-on-Tees town centre – connected via the Victoria, Teesquay Millennium, Princess of Wales and Infinity bridges.

Buildings and organisations 

The area consists of the following buildings, businesses and organisations.

 Advance House, St. Mark's Court – housing Stockton Probation, and the Commission for Social Care Inspection
 Alexander's Car Showroom
 Barclaycard House, Massey Road – housing Barclaycard
 Barclays House, Sabatier Close – housing Barclays
 Cavendish House, Prince's Wharf / Council of Europe Boulevard – housing the Tees Valley Combined Authority, Tees Valley Unlimited LEP and Cubic Transportation Systems.  Once housing One NorthEast and Tees Valley Regeneration development agencies
 Christine House, Sorbonne Close – housing Turner and Townsend, TABS Recruitment, Middlesbrough Recruitment
 Churchill House, Pearson Court, Pearson Way – formerly housing Churchill Insurance
 Clearwater House, Columbia Drive – housing Santander's mortgage operations
 Crutes House, Fudan Way – housing Crutes Law Firm and accountants Tait Walker
 Dunedin House, Columbia Drive – housing Standard Life, Atkins, Halcrow Group Limited, First Choice (travel firm) Holidays, and Energy Solutions International
 Endeavour House, St. Mark's Court – housing the Endeavour Housing Association and Teesdale Housing Association
 Florence House, Pearson Court, Pearson Way – housing Terra Nitrogen (UK) Limited
 George Stephenson House, St Mark's Court – housing HM Revenue and Customs
 Kvaerner
 OBC House, Sabatier Close – housing OBC Shipping Ltd
 Primecare – Cleveland, Massey Road
 Petroplus in St. Mark's Court
 Progress House, Fudan Way – housing the White Young Green Group
 PX House, Westpoint Road – housing PX Ltd (formerly part of Enron) a provider of operations, management and maintenance solutions
 Radio House, Yale Crescent, student accommodation, formerly TFM (radio) and Magic 1170
 Richard House, Sorbonne Close – housing Ofsted, TJ Hazel (Engineering Consultants) Ltd., Public Lending Right and Safe in Tees Valley Ltd.
 Robert House, Westpoint Road / Merchants Wharf – also housing PX Ltd
 St. Mark's House, St. Mark's Court – housing the DVLA, the Valuation Office Agency and the Insolvency Service
 Swan House, Westpoint Road – housing the Environment Agency
 Swiftcover, Fudan Way
 Teesdale House, Westpoint Road – housing the North East NHS Strategic Health Authority
 VAI House, Fudan Way – housing Siemens VAI (UK)
 Victoria House, Pearson Way – housing the stockbrokers Gerrard
 Visualsoft House, Prince's Wharf / Council of Europe Boulevard – housing Visualsoft and CEMEX
 Westminster House, St. Mark's Court – housing Endeavour Partnerships and LJJ Contractors.

 Educational institutions
 Durham University – Queen's Campus
 John Snow College, Sorbonne Close
 Stephenson College, East Drive
 Wolfson Research Institute, East Drive
 Stockton Riverside College, Harvard Avenue.

 Shops and services
 Sainsburys Local, Yale Crescent
 Teesdale Children's Day Nursery, Yale Crescent.

 Public houses
 The Dubliners – Bridge Street.

 Residential and nursing homes
 Alison House Residential Care Home, Fudan Way
 Kirkdale Nursing Home, Radcliffe Crescent
 Teesdale Lodge Nursing Home, Radcliffe Crescent.

 Residential Properties
 Anchorage Mews
 Claremont Court, Stanford Close
 Grosvenor House, Sorbonne Close
 Harriet House, Sorbonne Close
 Helen House, Sorbonne Close
 Rochester Court, Stanford Close
 The Waterside, Sorbonne Close
 Trinity Mews.

 Roads
 Chapel Street, Claremont Court,  Columbia Drive,  Council of Europe Boulevard,  East Drive,  Fudan Way,  Harvard Avenue,  Massey Road,  Pearson Way,  Princeton Drive,  Radcliffe Crescent,  Sabatier Close,  Sorbonne Close,  St. Mark's Court,  Stanford Close,  Station Street,  Teesdale Boulevard,  Trinity Mews,  University Boulevard,  Westpoint Road,  Yale Crescent.

 Bridges
 Teesquay Millennium Footbridge
 Princess of Wales Bridge
 Infinity Bridge
 Victoria Bridge

 Water features
 Merchants Wharf
 Prince's Wharf
 St. Mark's Basin south east of the Teesquay Millennium Bridge.

Historic note 

In 1987, after Head Wrightsons' Teesdale Works closed and the site had been cleared, Prime Minister Margaret Thatcher visited the site as part of her visit to Teesside to open the Teesside Development Corporation and made what has been poignantly termed her "Walk in the Wilderness".

References

External links 

 Wikimapia.

Business parks of England
Thornaby-on-Tees